Rufus Norris (born 16 January 1965) is a British theatre and film director, who is currently the Artistic Director and Chief Executive of the National Theatre.

Life and career
Norris grew up in Africa and Malaysia, attended North Bromsgrove High School and Kidderminster College of Further Education, and later trained as an actor at RADA before turning to directing.

In 2001 he won the Evening Standard Award for Outstanding Newcomer for his production of David Rudkin's Afore Night Come at the Young Vic.

In 2004, Norris won another Evening Standard Award, a Critic's Circle Award and an Olivier Award nomination for Best Director, for his production of Festen.

In 2006 he made his National Theatre debut directing Market Boy by David Eldridge. From 2002 to 2007 Norris was an Associate Director at the Young Vic, where his productions have included Feast by Yunior Garcia Aguilera, Rotimi Babatunde, Marcos Barbosa, Tanya Barfield and Gbolahan Obisesan (2013), Vernon God Little by DBC Pierre (2007), adapted by Tanya Ronder (2009 and 2011), Hergé's Adventures of Tintin, which Norris adapted with David Greig (Barbican, 2005; UK tour & West End, 2007) and his own adaptation of Sleeping Beauty (Young Vic, 2002; Barbican, 2004, UK & international tour).

His production of the Kander and Ebb musical Cabaret, produced by Bill Kenwright, ran at the Lyric Theatre in London's West End from 2006 to 2008. The production toured in 2008 and 2009 before being revived at the Savoy Theatre in 2012, followed by another UK tour. Another UK tour began in 2017.

In 2009, Norris's first film King Bastard, written by his wife Tanya Ronder, was produced by BBC Films. In the same year, he directed the National Theatre's production of Wole Soyinka's Death and the King's Horseman, which played in the Olivier Theatre.

He created the 2011 production Dr Dee for the Manchester International Festival, in collaboration with musician Damon Albarn, which was subsequently performed at ENO in 2012. In 2010 he directed Mozart's Don Giovanni, also for ENO.

Norris was made an Associate Director at the National Theatre in 2011. His production of London Road by Alecky Blythe and Adam Cork opened at the Cottesloe in 2011, before transferring to the Olivier in 2012, winning the Critics' Circle Award for Best Musical.

His 2012 film Broken premiered at the Cannes Film Festival and received the Golden Eye Award for best international film at the Zurich Film Festival. At the 2012 British Independent Film Awards it won the award for Best British Independent Film.

In 2013 his production of Tanya Ronder's play Table launched the new space, The Shed, at the National Theatre. He subsequently directed James Baldwin's The Amen Corner at the National Theatre.

Director of the National Theatre 
In March 2015, Norris replaced Nicholas Hytner as Artistic Director of the National Theatre. During his first season he directed the medieval play Everyman in a new adaptation by Carol Ann Duffy starring Chiwetel Ejiofor in the title role and for the Christmas season, the premiere of a new musical, Wonder.land (following a run in summer 2015 at the Manchester International Festival and prior to a run at the Théâtre du Châtelet in summer 2016) with music by Damon Albarn and lyrics and book by Moira Buffini, inspired by Lewis Carroll's novels Alice's Adventures in Wonderland and Through the Looking-Glass.

In summer 2016 he directed Bertolt Brecht and Kurt Weill's The Threepenny Opera, in a new adaptation by Simon Stephens and starring Rory Kinnear as Macheath. In spring 2017 he directed My Country; a work in progress by Carol Ann Duffy, using the words of people across the UK regarding Brexit, which was followed by a UK tour. In the Dorfman auditorium in July 2017 he directed a new play Mosquitoes by Lucy Kirkwood, starring Olivia Colman and Olivia Williams. In 2018 he directed his first Shakespeare play in 25 years, Macbeth, with a cast including Rory Kinnear as Macbeth and Anne-Marie Duff as Lady Macbeth.

In 2019, Norris directed Helen Edmundson's adaptation of Andrea Levy's book Small Island in the Olivier Theatre at the National Theatre. The critically acclaimed production was broadcast to cinemas worldwide by National Theatre Live. Following its initial sold-out run, Small Island was scheduled to return to the Olivier Theatre in late 2020, but the Covid-19 pandemic delayed its return until spring 2022. Small Island was also shown as part of the free National Theatre at Home steaming programme during the UK 2020 COVID-19 lockdown.

"Hex" opened in December 2021 but the production was curtailed in January 2022 due to a resurgence of COVID-19. It was restaged at the end of 2022 and ran into January 2023. The critical reaction was favourable,

Actions
On 16 August 2018, he condemned the destruction of the Said al-Mishal Cultural Centre in Gaza, which was destroyed by Israeli airstrikes on 11 August 2018.

Work

Theatre productions

Filmography
1990 Demon Wind
2009 King Bastard
2012 Broken
2015 London Road

References

External links

 

1965 births
Living people
British theatre directors
British film directors
Alumni of RADA